is a professional Japanese baseball player. He plays catcher for the Yokohama DeNA BayStars.

References 

1989 births
Living people
Japanese baseball players
Nippon Professional Baseball catchers
Yokohama DeNA BayStars players
Baseball people from Kyoto